Kelton is an unincorporated community in Wheeler County, Texas, United States.

The Kelton Independent School District serves area students.

External links
 

Unincorporated communities in Texas
Unincorporated communities in Wheeler County, Texas